Zirka Frometa Castillo (born 7 June 1963) is a Cuban chess player who holds the FIDE title of Woman Grandmaster (WGM, 2008). She is a three-time winner of the Cuban Women's Chess Championship.

Biography
From the early 1980s to the mid 2000s, Zirka Frometa was one of the leading chess players in the Cuba. Three times she won the Cuban Women's Chess Championships: 1981, 1983, 1987. In 2008 in San Salvador she won Pan American Women's Championship.

Frometa participated twice in the Women's World Chess Championship Interzonal Tournaments:
 In 1985, at Interzonal Tournament in Havana shared 11th-12th place with Asela de Armas Pérez;
 In 1987, at Interzonal Tournament in Tuzla ranked 17th place.

She played for Cuba in the Women's Chess Olympiads:
 In 1984, at third board in the 26th Chess Olympiad (women) in Thessaloniki (+6, =1, -4),
 In 1986, at third board in the 27th Chess Olympiad (women) in Dubai (+8, =2, -2) and won individual bronze medal,
 In 1988, at second board in the 28th Chess Olympiad (women) in Thessaloniki (+7, =2, -4),
 In 1990, at first reserve board in the 29th Chess Olympiad (women) in Novi Sad (+7, =0, -4),
 In 1994, at third board in the 31st Chess Olympiad (women) in Moscow (+4, =1, -5),
 In 2002, at third board in the 35th Chess Olympiad (women) in Bled (+3, =2, -5).

In 1979, Frometa was awarded the FIDE Woman International Master (WIM) title and received the FIDE Woman Grandmaster (WGM) in 2008.

References

External links
 
 
 

1963 births
Living people
Sportspeople from Santiago de Cuba
Cuban female chess players
Chess woman grandmasters
Chess Olympiad competitors